Francesco Scaratti (19 February 1939 – 16 August 2013) was an Italian professional football player.

He played for 7 seasons in the Serie A for SPAL 1907, A.C. Mantova and A.S. Roma.

He scored a dramatic last-minute-of-extra-time equalizer in the return leg of the semifinal of the 1969–70 European Cup Winners' Cup for A.S. Roma against Górnik Zabrze. Roma eventually lost to Górnik on a coin toss (the last time it was used as a tiebreaker in European football). A.S. Roma was a winner of a coin toss earlier in the tournament.

Honours
 Coppa Italia winner: 1968/69.

References

1939 births
2013 deaths
Italian footballers
Serie A players
Serie B players
A.C.N. Siena 1904 players
S.P.A.L. players
Mantova 1911 players
Hellas Verona F.C. players
A.S. Roma players
Association football defenders